Elizabeth Pugsley Hayward (December 23, 1854 – January 26, 1942) was an American politician and Democratic member of the Utah House of Representatives and Utah State Senate.

Biography 
Elizabeth Pugsley was born in Salt Lake City, Utah Territory, to recent English immigrants Philip and Martha Pugsley. She married Henry John Hayward in 1875, and was often known in her public life as "Mrs. H. J. Hayward." She served as President of Daughters of Utah Pioneers from 1917 to 1921.

Elizabeth Hayward was a member and officer of the local chapter of the Service Star Legion.

Legislative activity 
Hayward was first elected as a state representative for the Eighth District (Salt Lake City) in the Utah House of Representatives in 1914. She served on the Art, Public Health, and State Library Committees and introduced bills regarding art, education and child welfare. She was elected again in 1917.  She served in the Utah State Senate in the 1919 and 1921 sessions.

Elizabeth Hayward introduced the bill into the Utah State Senate ratifying the Nineteenth Amendment to the United States Constitution, which granted women the right to vote in national elections.

National political activity 
Elizabeth Hayward was a member of the Democratic National Committee. She served as a delegate to the 1908 Democratic National Convention, one of the first women to serve as a national delegate from either major party. She also served as a delegate to the 1916 Democratic National Convention in St. Louis and the 1920 Democratic National Convention in San Francisco.

Elizabeth Hayward was a charter member of the League of Women Voters.

References 

1854 births
1942 deaths
Latter Day Saints from Utah
American suffragists
Democratic Party members of the Utah House of Representatives
Politicians from Salt Lake City
Presidents of Daughters of Utah Pioneers
Democratic Party Utah state senators
Women state legislators in Utah
Mormon feminists
20th-century American women politicians
20th-century American politicians